Matakoro is a village in the commune of Martap, in the Adamawa Region of Cameroon.

Population 
In 1967, Matakoro contained 106 inhabitants, mainly Mboum.

At the time of the 2005 census, there were 1020 people in the village.

References

Bibliography 
 Jean Boutrais (ed.), Peuples et cultures de l'Adamaoua (Cameroun) : actes du colloque de Ngaoundéré, du 14 au 16 janvier 1992, ORSTOM, Paris ; Ngaoundéré-Anthropos, 1993, 316 p. 
 Dictionnaire des villages de l'Adamaoua, ONAREST, Yaoundé, October 1974, 133 p.

External links 
 Martap, on the website Communes et villes unies du Cameroun (CVUC)

Populated places in Adamawa Region